Uzir is a surname. Notable people with the surname include:
Hasnizam Uzir (1975), former Malaysian striker
Sushil Uzir (1957), Indian cricketer

Hindustani-language surnames
Surnames of Hindustani origin
Malaysian-language surnames